The Old South Restaurant is a historic diner and local restaurant landmark at 1330 East Main Street in Russellville, Arkansas.  It is a modular single-story structure, with streamlined Art Moderne styling consisting of exterior porcelain-coated aluminum paneling, bands of fixed windows, and a protruding aluminum entrance, above which a neon-lighted sign rises.  The diner was built in 1947 out of manufactured parts produced by the National Glass and Manufacturing Company of Fort Smith, Arkansas.  Construction time was six days.

The building was listed on the National Register of Historic Places in 1999.

See also
National Register of Historic Places listings in Pope County, Arkansas

References

Commercial buildings on the National Register of Historic Places in Arkansas
National Register of Historic Places in Pope County, Arkansas
Streamline Moderne architecture in Arkansas
Commercial buildings completed in 1947
Buildings and structures in Russellville, Arkansas
Diners on the National Register of Historic Places
1947 establishments in Arkansas
Restaurants established in 1947
Restaurants in Arkansas
Prefabricated buildings